Michael Charles Blunden (born December 15, 1986) is a Canadian former professional ice hockey winger. Over his professional career, Blunden has appeared in over 100 National Hockey League (NHL) games with the Ottawa Senators, Tampa Bay Lightning, Montreal Canadiens, Columbus Blue Jackets and Chicago Blackhawks.

Playing career
Blunden was drafted 43rd overall in the 2005 NHL Entry Draft by the Chicago Blackhawks from the Erie Otters of the Ontario Hockey League. After his final year with the Otters, Blunden signed a three-year entry level contract with the Chicago Blackhawks on May 24, 2006. Months prior to signing he made his professional debut with affiliate of the Blackhawks, the Norfolk Admirals of the AHL, for the 2005–06 playoff run.

Blunden made his NHL debut in the 2006–07 season with the Blackhawks playing in 9 games. His season was cut short when he suffered a shoulder injury on December 10, 2006, ruling him out for the rest of the season.

On January 10, 2009, Blunden was traded by the Blackhawks to the Columbus Blue Jackets for Adam Pineault.

On July 7, 2011 he was traded from the Columbus Blue Jackets to the Montreal Canadiens, in exchange for Ryan Russell. On July 1, 2012, the Canadiens re-signed Blunden to a  one-year, two-way contract extension.

On July 1, 2014, Blunden left the Canadiens organization to sign a one-year contract as a free agent with the Tampa Bay Lightning.

On June 29, 2015, the Lightning announced the re-signing of Blunden to a one-year, two-way contract. Blunden appeared in two regular season games with the Lightning last season, recording two penalty minutes. He also played in 33 games with the Syracuse Crunch, recording 13 goals and 22 points.

After two-years in the Lightning organization, Blunden left as a free agent to sign a two-year, two-way contract with the Ottawa Senators on July 1, 2016. After starting the season with Binghamton, Blunden made his Ottawa Senators debut on November 9, 2016 against the Buffalo Sabres.

After completing his contract with the Senators, Blunden left North America as a free agent after 13 years and signed a one-year deal with Italian outfit, HCB South Tyrol of the EBEL on July 18, 2018. Blunden contributed offensively with Bolzano, posting 33 points in 38 regular season games.

Following Bolzano's defeat in the playoffs, Blunden left as a free agent to sign in the neighbouring DEL, agreeing to a one-year contract with German club, Schwenninger Wild Wings on April 3, 2019.

Personal
Blunden was born on December 15, 1986, in Toronto, Ontario, Canada. He has one sister, Jennifer Blunden, and two brothers, Stephen Blunden & Sean Blunden, both of whom are also hockey players with Stephen enjoying his time in Canberra, Australia with the CBR Brave in the AIHL and Sean playing in the CIS for the Concordia University team, Concordia Stingers.

Career statistics

Regular season and playoffs

International

References

External links

 

1986 births
Living people
Belleville Senators players
Binghamton Senators players
Bolzano HC players
Canadian ice hockey right wingers
Chicago Blackhawks draft picks
Chicago Blackhawks players
Columbus Blue Jackets players
Erie Otters players
Hamilton Bulldogs (AHL) players
Montreal Canadiens players
Norfolk Admirals players
Ottawa Senators players
Rockford IceHogs (AHL) players
Schwenninger Wild Wings players
Ice hockey people from Toronto
Springfield Falcons players
Syracuse Crunch players
Tampa Bay Lightning players